Azteca México was an American subscription channel that carried a combined schedule of TV Azteca's three domestic Mexican networks at the time (Azteca 7, Azteca Trece and adn40) in the United States. The network was exclusive to DirecTV viewers, carried on its channel 442 next to the default national feed of Azteca América after June 2, 2008. Its scheduling was often live with the domestic Mexican networks it shared programming with, compared to Azteca América's different scheduling to compete against its American competitors. It also carried no sports programming outside of highlight and sports talk shows.

Azteca removed the channel on October 4, 2016, upon Estrella TV acquiring carriage on the service and assuming channel 442 in its place. The oncoming end of a competitor MundoMax and Azteca América finding new steam as it reacquired former affiliates from that network (and recruited new stations) likely also played a role in the discontinuation of Azteca México.

References

Companies based in Los Angeles
Grupo Salinas
TV Azteca broadcast television networks
Television channels and stations established in 2008
Television channels and stations disestablished in 2016
Spanish-language television networks in the United States
Television networks in Mexico